Justin Andrew Honard (born March 6, 1985) is an American drag queen and recording artist known by the stage name Alaska Thunderfuck 5000, primarily known mononymously as Alaska, from Erie, Pennsylvania. She is best known as the runner-up on the fifth season of RuPaul's Drag Race and the winner of the second season of RuPaul's Drag Race All Stars.

Honard co-hosts the web series Bro'Laska alongside her brother, Corey Binney. Her first studio album, Anus, was released in 2015, followed by her second album, Poundcake, in 2016, and her third album, Vagina, in 2019. Her fourth album, Red 4 Filth, was released in 2022. Honard is also a part of The AAA Girls, a drag group with Willam and Courtney Act and hosts the podcast Race Chaser with Willam.

Early life 
Honard was born to Pam Honard and raised in Erie, Pennsylvania, and graduated from Fort LeBoeuf High School in 2003. He has a brother, Cory. He studied theater at the University of Pittsburgh.

Career

2007–2012: Career beginnings 

Alaska originally moved to Los Angeles to pursue acting. Dissatisfied with the auditioning process, she turned to drag and got a job at the West Hollywood club Fubar. She frequently performed in the Trannyshack shows in Los Angeles. In 2009, she performed in Palm Springs Gay Pride with Tammie Brown and Jer Ber Jones.

Alaska met future boyfriend Sharon Needles (stage name of Aaron Coady) through Myspace in December 2009 and eventually moved back to Pittsburgh, Pennsylvania, to live with him in 2010. Along with Needles and Cherri Baum, she formed the band Haus of Haunt, which later evolved into a drag troupe based out of Pittsburgh bar the Blue Moon. As part of the Haus of Haunt, she helped present the Pittsburgh debut of fellow drag queen and recording artist Christeene Vale in 2013. Alaska later impersonated Vale for the music video "RuPaulogize" by Willam Belli.

2013–2015: RuPaul's Drag Race 
Alaska Thunderfuck competed on the fifth season of RuPaul's Drag Race, under the mononym Alaska. She had previously auditioned for every season of the show. Alaska won the fragrance commercial-themed main challenge in the episode "Scent of a Drag Queen" and the main challenge for "Sugar Ball." As part of the show, Alaska sang on the "We Are the World"-inspired song "Can I Get an Amen?". The song's proceeds helped benefit the Los Angeles Gay and Lesbian Center. At the season finale in May 2013, Alaska was declared the runner-up along with fellow competitor Roxxxy Andrews. Jinkx Monsoon was the winner of the season.

In October 2013, Alaska performed as Dr. Frank N. Furter in Woodlawn Theatre's production of The Rocky Horror Show in San Antonio, Texas. RuPaul's Drag Race judge Michelle Visage and season four contestant Willam Belli also starred in the musical.

Since appearing on RuPaul's Drag Race, Alaska has toured and performed, appearing in RuPaul's Drag Race Battle of the Seasons shows, the Drag Stars at Sea cruises, custom one-woman shows such as a Stevie Nicks tribute called "Stevie Forever", a cabaret show called "Red for Filth", and a holiday show called "Blue Christmas". An animated version of Alaska appeared in the "RuPaul's Drag Race: Dragopolis 2.0" mobile app. During the summer of 2014, she starred in a stage production of Sex and the City. With brother Cory Binney, Honard has a web series sponsored by World of Wonder, called Bro'Laska. In 2014, Alaska became a spokesmodel for American Apparel alongside Willam Belli and Courtney Act.

Alaska has since released a string of singles, namely "Ru Girl", "Your Makeup Is Terrible", and "Nails". In June 2015, Alaska's debut album, Anus, was released to positive reviews. Singles from the album included "Hieeee" and "This Is My Hair".

2016–present: RuPaul's Drag Race All Stars 2 
In 2016, Alaska returned to Drag Race for the second season of RuPaul's Drag Race All Stars. She won 4 challenges (Snatch game, Acting, Stand up, Advert) and was in the bottom for a makeover challenge. She received some backlash due to some of her choices of eliminations and her behavior toward the end of the competition. In response, Alaska donated $5,000 to the charity Trans Kids Purple Rainbow and posted an apology video online. In the season finale, she was crowned the second winner of All Stars.

In the same year, Alaska released her second album, titled Poundcake. Three singles from the album have been released: "The T", "Stun", and "Puppet". The album is named after the puppet challenge on RuPaul's Drag Race where Alaska and fellow contestant Lineysha Sparx created a rebellious puppet called Lil' Poundcake.

Alaska competed in the first season of VH1's Scared Famous, which premiered on October 23, 2017, and placed 6th in the competition.

Since July 2018 she has hosted a podcast with fellow Drag Race alumna Willam Belli. The podcast, titled "Race Chaser" is "devoted to the discussion and dissection of every episode of Rupaul's Drag Race." Alaska and Jeremy Mikush, performing as Alaska and Jeremy, released their debut album Amethyst Journey in August 2018.

In 2019, Alaska released her third album titled Vagina.
Soon after, she created and hosted The Drag Queen of the Year Pageant Competition Award Contest Competition, in Montalban Theater in Hollywood. The event was sold-out and featured eight different drag artists competing for the crown. The eventual winner, decided by Alaska and a panel of judges including Peppermint, Sharon Needles, Willam, and Abhora, a former contestant on season two of The Boulet Brothers' Dragula. In June 2019, a panel of judges from New York magazine placed her seventh on their list of "the most powerful drag queens in America", a ranking of 100 former Drag Race contestants.

Alaska's first comedy special, which is currently untitled, will air on OutTV in Canada in late 2019.

She is scheduled to release a memoir, My Name's Yours, What's Alaska?: A Memoir on November 9, 2021.

She is one of the most followed queens from Drag Race, and has accumulated over 1.8 million Instagram followers as of October, 2021.

Public image and artistry 
She has stated, "I am a huge fan of drag for many reasons; first and foremost being that it is an extremely important form of performance art. Drag uses humor as means of relaying a message, and because humor tends to get overlooked as a valid way to communicate through art, drag tends to get pigeonholed into being something ‘less than’ when you think about it in terms what you'd see at a museum. I can't think of almost anything more artistically redeeming than a huge museum full of drag queens, but maybe that's just me."

She has cited Gianni Versace, Lady Gaga and Marc Jacobs as her favorite fashion influences. Thought Catalog described her style as "risk-taking" and "creative", with "weird choices"; Yahoo! called her Lil Poundcake outfit a "pink nightmare" and "clownish crazy", and explained that "the drag and music world would certainly be very quiet without Ms Thunderfuck".

Honard's drag name is derived from Alaskan Thunderfuck, a strain of cannabis. Alaska counts Divine and Marilyn Monroe as her "role models".

Personal life 
Alaska was in a relationship with fellow drag queen Sharon Needles for four years before separating in November 2013. In June 2022 Honard's father was killed in a motorcycle crash; Honard wrote on social media that his father was "kind and loving and hilarious and had a beautiful heart, and had so much love for his family, his wife, my sister and me, and his grandchildren". He also wrote that he was "feeling a lot of pain and grief right now. I'm also feeling compassion for anyone who has ever lost someone they love".

Discography

Studio albums

Collaborative studio albums

Singles

As lead artist

As featured artist

Other appearances

Tours 
Access All Areas Tour (2017)
An Evening with Alaska (2018)

Filmography

Film

Television

Web series

Theatre

Music videos

Podcasts

Awards and nominations

Notes

References

External links 

 
 

1985 births
Living people
American drag queens
American gay musicians
LGBT people from Pennsylvania
American LGBT singers
RuPaul's Drag Race All Stars winners
RuPaul's Drag Race contestants
University of Pittsburgh alumni
Gay singers
American podcasters
21st-century American LGBT people
20th-century American LGBT people
American people of French-Canadian descent